Gerard Hallie (24 October 1911 – 7 July 2002) was a Dutch coxswain. He competed at the 1936 Summer Olympics in Berlin with the men's coxed four where they came fourth.

References

1911 births
2002 deaths
Dutch male rowers
Olympic rowers of the Netherlands
Rowers at the 1936 Summer Olympics
Sportspeople from Zaanstad
Coxswains (rowing)
European Rowing Championships medalists